SpyBouncer is a rogue security software application developed by SRC Technologies for the Microsoft Windows operating system.

SpyBouncer has been listed by Spyware Warrior as a "rogue anti-spyware" program for its use of aggressive advertising and deliberate false positives. It is described by Symantec, the makers of Norton Antivirus, as "a program that may give exaggerated reports of threats on the compromised computer. It will then prompt the user to purchase a registered version of the software in order to remove the reported threats."

References

Adware